AJK Tourism and Archaeology Department is a department of Azad Jammu and Kashmir Government in Pakistan. The main aim of this department is to promote travel and tourism in Azad Kashmir. The department provides information and accommodation facilities to tourists in different places in state. It also arranges fairs,  festivals and events to promote tourism.

The head office of the department is located in Muzaffarabad. Some regional and information offices are located in different places in Azad Kashmir.

Huts and lodges

District Neelam
 Tourist Lodge, Kutton
 Tourist Lodge, Keran
 Tourist Motel, Keran
 Tourist Huts, Neelam Village
 Tourist Lodge, Dowarian
 Tourist Lodge, Sharda
 Youth Hostel 1, Sharda
 Youth Hostel 2, Sharda
 Tourist Motel, Kel
 Tourist Motels Taobat

District Muzaffarabad
 Tourist Lodge, Shaheed Gali
 Tourist Lodge, Danna
 Tourist Lodge, Saran
 Tourist Lodge, Bersala

District Bagh
 Tourist Lodge, Sudhan Gali
 Tourist Huts (3), Dhirkot
 Tourist Lodge, Neela Butt
 Tourist Lodge, Las Danna
 Tourist Lodge, Kotla
 Tourist Lodge, Ganga Choti
 Tourist Lodge, Panjal Mastan National Park
 Tourist Lodge, Naza Gali
 Tourist Lodge, Nanga Pir
District Poonch
 Tourist Lodge, Paniola
 Tourist Lodge, Koyian
 Tourist Lodge, Banjosa
 Tourist Lodge, Ghori Mar
 Tourist Lodge, Tatta Pani
District Sudhnoti
 Tourist lodge, Dana Pothimeer Khan
 Tourist lodge, Kelaan Bloch
 Tourist lodge, Gorah valley
 Tourist lodge, kaanqadi kotkotli nakr
 Tourist lodge, Dana nagesher 
District Kotli
 Tourist Lodge, Sarda
 Tourist Lodge, Teenda
 Tourist Lodge, Fatehpur

District Mirpur
 Tourist Hut, Mirpur

District Bhimber
 Tourist Lodge, Jandi Chontra

References 

Azad Kashmir